DWWQ (89.3 FM), broadcasting as Barangay FM 89.3, is a radio station owned and operated by GMA Network Inc. subsidiary Radio GMA. The station's studio and transmitter are located at the 4th Floor of VillaBlanca Hotel, Pattaui St., Brgy. Ugac Norte, Tuguegarao.

References

External links

www.ustream.tv/channel/radio-gma-893fm-tuguegarao

Radio stations established in 1996
Barangay FM stations
Radio stations in Cagayan